First Presbyterian Church of Le Roy is a historic Presbyterian church located at Le Roy, Genesee County, New York. The church was built about 1825–1826, in the traditional meeting house style and consisted of a gable-roofed main block with a bell tower and an engaged center pavilion.  It was later renovated in the Italianate style in 1866.  Additions were made to the original building in 1898–1899, 1913, and 1951 and, between about 1929 and 1951, the current Roman Doric portico was added. The 1913 Sunday School addition designed by Claude Bragdon, the portico, and the 1951 Elizabeth Allen Olmsted Memorial Hall are in the Colonial Revival style. Also on the property is the contributing former manse; a two-story Queen Anne-style brick building built about 1880.

It was listed on the National Register of Historic Places in 2014.

References

External links
First Presbyterian Church of Le Roy website

19th-century Presbyterian church buildings in the United States
Presbyterian churches in New York (state)
Churches on the National Register of Historic Places in New York (state)
Italianate architecture in New York (state)
Queen Anne architecture in New York (state)
Colonial Revival architecture in New York (state)
Churches completed in 1826
Churches in Genesee County, New York
National Register of Historic Places in Genesee County, New York
Italianate church buildings in the United States